The  are botanical gardens located at 709 Wachi, Muraoka-cho, Mikata-gun, Kami, Hyōgo, Japan. They are open daily in the warmer months; an admission fee is charged.

The gardens were established in 1997, and now contain more than 1,000 native plant species, a Katsura tree (Cercidiphyllum japonicum) that the garden describes as more than 1,000 years old, and water features including a stream, ponds, and swamp.

See also 

 List of botanical gardens in Japan

References 
 Tajima Plateau Botanical Gardens (Japanese)
 Hyogo Tourism information

Botanical gardens in Japan
Gardens in Hyōgo Prefecture
Kami, Hyōgo (Mikata)
1997 establishments in Japan